The 2012 Dakar Rally was the 34th running of the event. It was held in South America for the fourth successive time.

Summary
By 17 March 2011, Argentine president Cristina Fernández de Kirchner announced that the start would be in Mar del Plata, Argentina, the first stage would end in Bahía Blanca. The course would later cross the provinces of La Pampa, Mendoza, San Juan, La Rioja and Catamarca before crossing to Chile and finally ending in Peru.

On 9 January 2011, Peruvian press announced that Peru would host the three final stages of the 2012 Dakar Rally, with Lima, the Peruvian capital, hosting the awards ceremony. The official announcement took place on 18 February in Paris. A map displaying these final stages was also published.

Fatal accidents
Near the end of the first stage, motorcycle rider Jorge Andrés Boero died following a crash. It was the 21st death of a competitor in the history of the rally.
During stage 2, the ultralight aircraft of a father son duo watching the race crashed. Both died at the scene.

Stages
The sixth stage of the rally was cancelled due to heavy rain and snowfalls in the Anden-region near the border of Argentina and Chile.

Notes:
 — Robby Gordon forfeited these stage victories due to later losing the appeal for his disqualification after the tenth stage.

Summary

Bikes
The competition in the category rapidly developed into a two-horse race between KTM riders Cyril Despres and Marc Coma, who between them had won each previous Dakar event since 2005. It was Coma who seized the advantage initially with a victory on stage two, but a navigational error during the third stage dropped him ten minutes behind Despres. The gap between the pair remained close to the ten-minute mark until Despres lost time by getting stuck in mud during the eighth stage, allowing Coma to re-take the lead. The battle remained extremely close for the following stages, with Coma and Despres exchanging the lead on two further occasions before the outcome of the battle was effectively settled during the thirteenth stage – Coma lost almost an hour to his rival, largely through the result of a 45-minute penalty for an engine change but also due to gearbox issues and further navigational trouble. That allowed Despres to take a comfortable victory over Coma by a margin of 53 minutes, with Yamaha rider Hélder Rodrigues, who had held third position since the fourth stage, a further 18 minutes behind the Spaniard having picked up two stage wins during the event. KTM riders Jordi Viladoms and Štefan Svitko completed the top five, with Pål Anders Ullevålseter, who won the final stage of the event, in sixth position. Francisco Lòpez, who won the opening stage, had been running in fourth but was forced to retire after the seventh stage due to a fall which aggravated a previous knee injury.

Quads
Sergio Lafuente took the first two-stage wins before losing an hour during the third stage. That handed the advantage briefly to Alejandro Patronelli, but his countryman Tomas Maffei seized the lead after victory in the fourth stage. However, both Maffei and Marcos Patronelli, brother of Alejandro, both effectively dropped out of contention when both lost considerable ground (54 minutes and 1 hour 20 minutes respectively) during the seventh stage, giving Alejandro Patronelli a lead of almost an hour after winning the stage. He took a further two stage wins en route to a comfortable victory in the overall classification by a margin of 1 hour and 20 minutes. Maffei lost second position in the ninth stage, and would finish in third overall despite winning the last two stages, 54 minutes down on the second of the Patronelli brothers. Completing the all-Yamaha, all-South American top five were Ignacio Casale, six hours adrift of the winning time, and Lafuente, who was another two hours further behind.

Cars
With the withdrawal of the Volkswagen Motorsport works team, the first privateer winner since Jean-Louis Schlesser in 2000 was assured. The all-new X-Raid Mini All4 proved immediately competitive, with Leonid Novitskiy winning the first stage, Nani Roma winning the third stage and nine-time Dakar winner Stéphane Peterhansel re-taking the lead of the overall classification after taking victory in the fourth stage. Krzysztof Hołowczyc, also at the wheel of a Mini, held second behind Peterhansel after winning the fifth stage and remained inside the top three until power steering failure during the tenth stage ruled him out of contention.

Roma then became Peterhansel's closest rival, with 19 minutes separating the pair after the Spaniard's win in the tenth stage. Roma would eventually finish the rally in second position, 40 minutes down on his teammate after getting stuck in sand dunes on the penultimate stage, with Peterhansel taking his tenth Dakar victory after adding to his stage win tally during the penultimate stage. 2009 winner Giniel de Villiers, driving a Toyota Hilux, finished a distant third overall, 32 minutes behind Roma, having failed to win any stages. Novitskiy was classified in fourth position after winning stage twelve, albeit over two hours behind Peterhansel.

It was an event to forget for defending champion Nasser Al-Attiyah. He lost nine minutes during the first stage after his Hummer's engine lost oil pressure. The Qatari went on to win the second stage, but lost over half an hour to Peterhansel in the fourth stage; winning the seventh stage had seen Al-Attiyah recover to sixth place before engine and alternator problems during the ninth stage warranted his retirement. Teammate Robby Gordon was at this stage just five minutes behind Peterhansel with a win on the ninth stage, but the gap increased to 20 minutes when the American hit a rock on the tenth stage. An illegal modification to his Hummer's engine then saw Gordon disqualified, though he continued to compete under appeal for the remainder of the rally. He would have finished fifth in the overall classification with three further stage wins, Toyota driver Lucio Alvarez inheriting the position as a result of Gordon losing the appeal.

Trucks
Never outside the top two of the overall classification, the event was dominated by Iveco driver Gérard de Rooy. After finishing second to fellow Dutch competitor Marcel van Vliet in the opening stage, de Rooy won the second to lead the overall classification and re-took the lead after victory in the fourth stage. He consolidated his lead with two more successive stage victories, opening a 15-minute advantage over Aleš Loprais before the Tatra driver was forced to retire after an accident in the non-timed section of the ninth stage. De Rooy then held a 47-minute advantage over teammate Hans Stacey, a gap he extended to 51 minutes by the end of the event with a final stage victory in the twelfth stage. Stacey secured second in the overall standings despite not having won any stages, with Artur Ardavichus the best of the Kamaz entries in third position – 1 hour and 47 minutes down on de Rooy with victory in the tenth stage to his credit.

Eduard Nikolaev, taking over as de facto Kamaz team leader after the retirement of Vladimir Chagin and Firdaus Kabirov, was excluded for an incident with a competitor in the car category during the fourth stage. Kamaz drivers Andrey Karginov, who won the eleventh stage, and Ilgizar Mardeev completed the top five. Former World Rally champion Miki Biasion was running third before losing over six hours during a torrid seventh stage, though the Italian won two more stages (to add to his victory on the third stage) en route to recovering to sixth place overall.

Stage results

Bikes

Quads

Cars

Trucks

Final standings

Bikes

Quads

Cars

Trucks

References

External links

 
 Dakar Rally 2012 photos (cc-by-sa 3.0)

Dakar Rally
Dakar Rally
Dakar Rally
Dakar Rally